The Moir Farm is an historic farmstead in Woodland, Aroostook County, Maine, United States. It was established in 1837 as one of the first white settler establishments in the Allagash region.

References

1837 establishments in Maine
Farms in Aroostook County, Maine